Constantine Alexander Ionides (14 May 1833 in Manchester – 29 June 1900 in Brighton) was a British art patron and collector, of Greek ancestry.

He was born in Britain on 14 May 1833 in Manchester, the son of the collector and businessman Alexander Constantine Ionides, who had come to Britain from Constantinople in 1827. His younger siblings were Aglaia Coronio (b. 1834), Luca (b. 1837), Alexandro (b. 1840) and Chariclea (b. 1844). He is best known for his bequest of 82 oil paintings to the Victoria and Albert Museum. He is buried in Hove.

External links

1833 births
1900 deaths
British art collectors
People from Manchester
British people of Greek descent
Burials in Sussex